The Poisons Act 1972 is an Act of the Parliament of the United Kingdom (citation 1972 c. 66) making provisions for the sale of non-medicinal poisons, and the involvement of Local Authorities and the Royal Pharmaceutical Society of Great Britain in their regulation.

The act refers to the Pharmacy and Poisons Act 1933, and the Poisons List. Non-medical poisons are divided into two separate lists. List one substances may only be sold by a registered Pharmacist, and list two substances may be sold by a registered pharmacist or a licensed retailer.

Further provisions are made, to enable the Royal Pharmaceutical Society to enforce the compliance with the act by pharmacists, and impose fines for breaches.

Local Authorities are responsible for vetting applications for list two substances, for law enforcement and control of licensed premises.

References

United Kingdom Acts of Parliament 1972
Poisons
Toxicology in the United Kingdom